Tibor Baranyai (born 29 April 1978 in Budapest) is a Hungarian football defender currently playing for Soproni VSE.

External links
Ferencvárosi profile 
Player profile at HLSZ 

1978 births
Living people
Footballers from Budapest
Hungarian footballers
Association football defenders
Ferencvárosi TC footballers
Kecskeméti TE players
BFC Siófok players
Győri ETO FC players
Vasas SC players
Budapest Honvéd FC players
Fehérvár FC players
Soproni VSE players
21st-century Hungarian people